Pyrausta acrionalis, the mint-loving pyrausta moth, is a moth of the family Crambidae. It is found in eastern North America, including Alabama, Georgia, Massachusetts, Mississippi, New Hampshire, New York, Ontario, Tennessee, West Virginia and Wisconsin.

The wingspan is 14–18 mm. Adults have deep rose to violet forewings with yellow borders along the leading edge and the fringes of the wing, as well as some yellow markings.

The larvae feed on the leaves of Mentha species.

References

Moths described in 1859
acrionalis
Moths of North America